Jonas Elmer (born 14 March 1966) is a Danish film director, screenwriter and previously an actor. In 1988 he was a production assistant at the set of Family Business, starring Sean Connery.

Elmer graduated in direction at the National Film School of Denmark in 1995. His debut as a director came with the Danish film Let's Get Lost which won him a Robert and Bodil Award for Best Danish Film. Since then, he has directed the Danish feature films Monas verden and Nynne. He has also directed 21 episodes of the Danish sit-com Langt fra Las Vegas. He directed his first American feature film in 2008, New in Town, starring Renée Zellweger and Harry Connick, Jr, which was released in January 2009. In 2013 he directed the film In Real Life, a production about human desire to have their unmet needs satisfied, and shows their passions, desperation and delusion.

Filmography 

 I Credited as associate producer.

Awards and nominations 
 1995 Internationales Festival der Filmhochschulen München – Script Preis der Drehbuchwerkstatt München: Debut
 1998 FIPRESCI Prize – Special Mention: Let's Get Lost – "For its light-hearted and gentle perspective on human nature, its frailties and hopes."
 1998 Robert Award, winner: Danish feature film of the year – Let's Get Lost
 1998 Bodil Award, winner: Best Danish Film – Let's Get Lost
 1999 NatFilm Festival – Night Dreamer Award winner
 2001 International Filmfestival Mannheim-Heidelberg – Special Prize in Memoriam R.W. Fassbinder, winner: Monas verden
 2002 Robert award, nomination: Danish feature film of the year – Monas verden
 2004 Dansk HipHop Pris, winner: Music video director of the year – "Sulten" by Jokeren

References

External links 
 
 Bebop Film
 Original trailer for Let's Get Lost
 Jonas Elmer's In Real Life at Eurochannel

1966 births
Danish film directors
Living people